Salfords and Sidlow is a civil parish in the Reigate and Banstead borough of Surrey, England. It has a population of 3,069. The parish includes the villages of Salfords and Sidlow.

Demography and housing

The average level of accommodation in the region composed of detached houses was 28%, the average that was apartments was 22.6%.

The proportion of households in the civil parish who owned their home outright compares to the regional average of 35.1%.  The proportion who owned their home with a loan compares to the regional average of 32.5%.  The remaining % is made up of rented dwellings (plus a negligible % of households living rent-free).

References

Reigate and Banstead
Civil parishes in Surrey